The narrowtail moray (Gymnothorax angusticauda) is a moray eel found in the Pacific and Indian Oceans, in the Red Sea, and around Indonesia. It was first named by Weber and de Beaufort in 1916.

References

angusticauda
Fish described in 1916